Aliabad-e Sorkhak (also Romanized as ‘Alīābād-e Sorkhak; also known as ‘Alīābād-e Sorkheh and Sorkhak) is a village in Jangal Rural District, in the Central District of Fasa County, Fars Province, Iran. At the 2006 census, its population was 254, in 58 families.

References 

Populated places in Fasa County